The Women's pursuit competition at the 2017 World Championships was held on 12 February 2017.

Results
The race was started at 10:30.

References

Women's pursuit
2017 in Austrian women's sport
Biath